Retromer is a complex of proteins that has been shown to be important in recycling transmembrane receptors from endosomes to the trans-Golgi network (TGN).

Background 

Retromer is a heteropentameric complex, which in humans is composed of a less defined membrane-associated sorting nexin dimer (SNX1, SNX2, SNX5, SNX6), and a vacuolar protein sorting (Vps) trimer containing Vps26, Vps29, Vps35. Although the SNX dimer is required for the recruitment of retromer to the endosomal membrane, the cargo binding function of this complex is contributed by the core trimer through the binding of Vps35 subunit to various cargo molecules  including M6PR wntless and sortilin. Early study on sorting of acid hydrolases such as carboxypeptidase Y (CPY) in S. cerevisiae mutants has led to the identification of retromer in mediating the retrograde trafficking of the pro-CPY receptor (Vps10) from the endosomes to the TGN.

Structure 

The retromer complex is highly conserved: homologs have been found in C. elegans, mouse and human.  The retromer complex consists of 5 proteins in yeast: Vps35p, Vps26p, Vps29p, Vps17p, Vps5p.  The mammalian retromer consists of  Vps26, Vps29, Vps35, SNX1 and SNX2, and possibly SNX5 and SNX6.  It is proposed to act in two subcomplexes: (1) Cargo recognition complex that consist of Vps35, Vps29 and Vps26 (Vps trimer), and (2) SNX-BAR dimers which consist of SNX1 or SNX2 and SNX5 or SNX6 that facilitates endosomal membrane remodulation and curvature resulting in the formation of tubules/vesicles which transports cargo molecules to the trans-golgi network (TGN).

Function 

The retromer complex has been shown to mediate retrieval of various transmembrane receptors, such as the cation-independent mannose 6-phosphate receptor, the functional mammalian counterpart of Vps10, and the Wnt receptor Wntless.  Retromer is required for the recycling of Kex2p and DPAP-A which also cycle between the trans-Golgi network and a pre-vacuolar (yeast endosome equivalent) compartment in yeast.  It is also required for the recycling of the cell surface receptor CED-1, which is necessary for phagocytosis of apoptotic cells.

Retromer plays a central role in the retrieval of several different cargo proteins from the endosome to the trans-Golgi network.  However, it is clear that there are other complexes and proteins that act in this retrieval process.  So far it is not clear whether other components that have been identified in the retrieval pathway act with retromer in the same pathway or are involved in alternative pathways. Recent studies have implicated retromer sorting defects in Alzheimer's disease and late-onset Parkinson disease

Retromer also seems to play a role in Hepatitis C Virus replication.

Retromer-mediated retrograde trafficking
The association of the Vps35-Vps29-Vps26 complex to the cytosolic domains of cargo molecules endosomal membranes initiates the activation of retrograde trafficking and cargo capture. The nucleation complex was formed through the interaction of VPS complex with GTP-activated Rab7 with clathrin, clathrin-adaptors and various binding proteins.

The SNX-BAR dimer enters the nucleation complex via direct binding or lateral movement on endosomal surface. The increased level of Retromer SNX-BARs causes a conformational switch to a curvature-inducing mode which initiates membrane tubule formation. Once the cargo carriers are matured, the carrier scission is then catalyzed by dynamin-II or EHD1, together with the mechanical forces generated by actin polymerization and motor activity.

The cargo carrier is transported to the TGN by motor proteins such as dynein. Tethering of the cargo carrier to the recipient compartment will lead to the uncoating of the carrier which is driven by ATP-hydrolysis and Rab7-GTP hydrolysis. Once released from the carrier, the Vps35-Vps29-Vps26 complex and the SNX-BAR dimers get recycled back onto the endosomal membranes.

References 

Biochemistry
Cell biology